Notiphila pulchrifrons is a species of shore flies (insects in the family Ephydridae).

Distribution
United States, Neotropical.

References

Ephydridae
Taxa named by Hermann Loew
Diptera of North America
Diptera of South America
Insects described in 1872